Ferenc Rónay or Francisc Rónay (29 April 1900 – 6 April 1967) was a Hungarian-Romanian footballer and manager.

Rónay was the first ever scorer of the Romania national football team, giving them the equaliser against Yugoslavia in their debut, part of the 1922 King Alexander's Cup. Romania went on to win the game 2-1 thanks to Aurel Guga. He was also part of Romania's squad for the football tournament at the 1924 Summer Olympics, but he did not play in any matches.

Honours

Manager
Steaua București
Cupa României: 1950

References

External links

1900 births
1967 deaths
Sportspeople from Arad, Romania
Romanian footballers
Romania international footballers
Olympic footballers of Romania
Footballers at the 1924 Summer Olympics
Liga I players
Liga II players
Vagonul Arad players
CA Oradea players
Romanian football managers
CA Oradea managers
CS Gaz Metan Mediaș managers
FC Steaua București managers
FC Rapid București managers
Romania national football team managers
Association football forwards